My Way is the second studio album by American singer Usher. It was released on September 16, 1997, by LaFace Records in North America. The album features guest appearances from Monica, Jermaine Dupri, and Lil' Kim. The album was supported by three singles,  all multi platinum-selling: "Nice & Slow", "My Way", and "You Make Me Wanna...".

With most of the album production by Babyface and Dupri, the album became a commercial success, debuting at number 15 on the Billboard 200 and peaking at number four. The album also reached number four on the US Top R&B/Hip-Hop Albums chart and eventually topped the Billboard R&B/Hip-Hop Albums chart for three weeks. It was certified seven times platinum by the Recording Industry Association of America (RIAA). My Way became Usher's breakthrough album and earned him a nomination for the Grammy Award for Best Male R&B Vocal Performance for "You Make Me Wanna...".

Critical reception 

In a contemporary review, The Source magazine said with My Way, "Usher proves that he's aiming to become more than just R&B music's best kept secret". Asondra R. Hunter from Vibe said that Usher is sensual through his mild and gentle tone and tasteful, refined lyrics. Robert Christgau, writing in The Village Voice, cited "Just Like Me" and "You Make We Wanna..." as highlights, and quipped that Usher was "the sweetest nonvirgin a mama could ask". He gave My Way a one-star honorable mention, indicating "a worthy effort consumers attuned to its overriding aesthetic or individual vision may well like." In a negative review for Rolling Stone, David Fricke felt that the album has too many downtempo songs, and criticized the writing and production quality.

In a retrospective review for AllMusic, Stephen Thomas Erlewine gave My Way four out of five stars and praised Usher's vocal restraint, but noted inconsistency in quality. In a 2002 review, Q magazine also gave it four stars and wrote that it established Usher's reputation as a young and skillful performer of R&B slow jams. Keith Harris, writing in The Rolling Stone Album Guide (2004), gave it three-and-a-half stars and said that, although Dupri's combination of hi-hat hits, acoustic-guitar arpeggios, and occasional guest raps from him and Lil Kim can inhibit the album, My Way was the work of a significant, enterprising artist. Yahoo! Music's Billy Johnson Jr. credited the album for Usher's breakthrough into the music industry, and lauded the production of the three singles.

Accolades

Commercial performance
My Way debuted at number 15 on the US Billboard 200 chart dated October 4, 1997, selling 66,000 copies in its first week in the United States. It entered the Top R&B/Hip-Hop Albums at number four on that same week. The album rose to number one on the Top R&B/Hip-Hop Albums on January 10, 1998; it topped the chart for three consecutive weeks, and remained on the chart for a total of seventy-five weeks. My Way peaked at number four on the Billboard 200, and spent seventy-nine weeks on that chart. It has since been certified six times platinum by the Recording Industry Association of America (RIAA) for sales of over six million copies in the United States. As of 2002, it had sold six million copies in the United States and seven million copies worldwide. In Sept 2022, the album was finally certified to have sold seven million copies in the US alone.

Track listing

Sample credits
 "Come Back" contains a sample of "Woman to Woman" by Joe Cocker.
 "One Day You'll Be Mine" contains a sample of "Footsteps in the Dark" by The Isley Brothers.

Personnel
Credits are adapted from Allmusic and album's liner notes.

 Babyface – executive producer; producer, background vocals, keyboards, and drum programming (tracks 4, 8); bass (track 4)
 Butch BelAir – photography
 Michael Benabib – photography
 Kyle Bess – mixing assistant (tracks 4, 8)
 Paul Boutin – engineer (tracks 4, 8)
 Trina Broussard – background vocals (track 9)
 Jermaine Dupri – executive producer, producer (tracks 1–3, 5, 6, 9, 10), mixing (tracks 2, 3, 5, 6, 9), instruments (tracks 1, 10), background vocals
 Nathan East – bass (track 8)
 Brian Frye – mixing assistant (tracks 1–3, 5, 6, 9, 10)
 John Frye – mixing assistant (tracks 1–3, 9, 10)
 Jon Gass – mixing (tracks 4, 8)
 Şerban Ghenea – engineer (track 7)
 John Hayes – engineer (track 7)
 Jagged Edge – background vocals (track 3)
 Lil' Kim – vocals (track 2)
 Trey Lorenz – background vocals (tracks 6, 9)
 Manny Marroquin – engineer (tracks 4, 8)
 George Meyers – engineer (track 7)
 Monica – lead and background vocals (track 4)
 Greg Phillinganes – piano (tracks 4, 8)
 Herb Powers – mastering
 L.A. Reid – executive producer
 Ivy Skoff – production coordination (track 8)
 Manuel Seal – co-producer (tracks 2, 3, 5, 6, 9), instruments (tracks 1, 10), background vocals (tracks 6, 9)
 Shanice – background vocals (track 8)
 LaKimbra Sneed – design
 Phil Tan – engineer and mixing (tracks 1–3, 5, 6, 9, 10)
 Usher – vocals (all tracks)
 Randy Walker – MIDI programming (tracks 4, 8)
 D.L. Warfield – art direction
 Rob Williams – engineer (track 2)
 Sprague "Doogie" Williams – producer (track 7)

Charts

Weekly charts

Year-end charts

Decade-end charts

Certifications

See also
List of number-one R&B albums in the United States

References

Bibliography

External links
 

1997 albums
Usher (musician) albums
LaFace Records albums
Arista Records albums
Albums produced by Jermaine Dupri
Albums produced by Babyface (musician)

it:My Way (disambigua)#Musica